Tommee James Profitt (born November 12, 1984) is an American songwriter and producer.

Biography 
Profitt is originally from Grand Rapids, Michigan, United States. He moved to Nashville, Tennessee in 2017 to continue his music career. He has worked on the production and sound development of rapper NF. In later years, he has also worked in film and television music.

Profitt's music has been featured in  24, Legacies, Quantico, The Good Doctor, Prison Break, The Rookie, America's Got Talent, Empire, Bones, The Handmaid's Tale, The Hunger Games: Mockingjay Part 2, NFL, TYR Sport, and others. He has won two Dove Awards and has been nominated for five.

Profitt's music has been used for video game promos and scores including Ghost Recon Breakpoint, Apex Legends, Assassin's Creed, UFC2, and Madden.

In 2018, Profitt held the Top TV Song for two consecutive weeks with covers of Linkin Park's "In The End", featuring singer-songwriter Fleurie and American rapper Jung Youth. Another collaboration, "Wake Me Up", featuring Fleurie, charted on iTunes Top 50 and on Spotify's Top 50 Viral chart.

Collaborations 
Profitt is known for his production work with American rapper NF. The two met in Michigan while NF was starting out as a rapper and Profitt was transitioning from being a full-time artist to a producer. Profitt signed his publishing deal with Capitol CMG Publishing in 2014, the same year that NF signed to Capitol Christian Music Group as an artist. They have continued to be frequent collaborators, with Profitt collaborating on the writing and production on NF's four full-length releases that have been released under Capitol CMG.

The first album, Mansion, debuted at No. 1 on the Billboard Christian Albums chart and peaked at No. 62 on the Billboard 200 Albums chart. The second album, Therapy Session, also debuted at No. 1 on the Christian Albums Chart and peaked at No. 12 on the Billboard 200. NF's third studio album, Perception, debuted at No. 1 overall on the Billboard 200; his fourth studio album, The Search, did so too. With over one billion global streams, their song, “Let You Down,” claimed the No. 1 spot on the Billboard Pop Chart and went on to become an 8x RIAA Certified Platinum single. In addition to his work with NF, Tommee has worked with Hunter Hayes, Migos, The Score, Avril Lavigne, Social Club Misfits, Angie Rose, TobyMac, Chris Tomlin, Crowder, Britt Nicole, SVRCINA, Colton Dixon, Josh Groban, Nicole Nordeman, Blanca, Ruelle, Jung Youth, Fleurie, and others.

Cinematic Songs collection 
Profitt's releases include six Cinematic Song volumes compiling his collaborations with other artists in film and television, as well as Gloria Regali, his most recent sync-focused collaboration with Fleurie.

Discography

Albums

Dove Awards

Film and television placements

References

Songwriters from Michigan
Living people
1984 births
Musicians from Nashville, Tennessee